The men's pole vault event at the 1990 Commonwealth Games was held on 2 February at the Mount Smart Stadium in Auckland.

Results

References

Pole
1990